A number of different aircraft designs were produced by Loening under the name Air Yacht. These include:

 the original Air Yacht – the Model 23 operated by the USAAS as the S-1
 the C-2 Air Yacht
 the C-4 Air Yacht, later marketed by Keystone-Loening as the K-85